Colias ponteni is a butterfly in the  family Pieridae that is thought to be extinct. It was described as Colias ponteni in 1860, eight years after it was said to have been found in Hawaii during midsummer of 1852. The reason for the extinction of this butterfly is very likely to be attributed to the new planting of sugar cane and other crops that were planted in the area around Honolulu on Oahu in the mid-1850s after the extensive European colonization.

Description 
The wings orange-colored on the top: the outer part of the wings deep brown, with yellow scales; a spot along the outer portion of the leading edge and the ribs black; the wing root and the outer part of the leading edge yellow-green; outermost part of the front edge reddish; three yellow lines along the ribs closest to the wing tip; the lashes reddish; the front edge of the wing wings brown, their edge deep black, the inner edge yellow; body brown, greenish; the antennas brown with thin club. The wings are yellow-green on the underside; the wings red in the disk field; a triangular red spot; a black-brown disk string from the inner edge along the third center rib, outwardly sharp toothed, inward diffuse; inner surface deep reddish brown; the lashes cut; the backsplash disk field yellow; disk spot orange with brown circumference and two orange dots at the base; body yellow, legs cut. Wings span 2 inches. The front wings with three golden yellow spots at the wing tip and two at the anal angle between the ribs; the background darker, otherwise like the male; the back wings brown: the inner half scaly red; a disk line of stains, of which the two upper yellows, the lower ones longer and red; the surface along the rear body bleached sulfur yellow; body blackish, head hairy. The underside of the wings light green: the inner half of the wings red; the front and outer edges pink; a sub-marginal line continues along the upper disk rib, otherwise as in the male; body whitish. Wings span 1 inch + 11 lines Port Famine.

References

ponteni
Butterflies of Oceania
Insects of Hawaii
Butterflies described in 1860
Taxa named by Hans Daniel Johan Wallengren